The Battle of Kiev of December 1919 was the third of three battles fought that year in Kiev, the capital of Ukraine during the Russian Civil War.

The Kiev operation (December 10–16, 1919) was an offensive operation of the 12th Army under command of Sergei Mezheninov  against some 9,000 White Guard troops under command of Abram Dragomirov.

The 58th Infantry Division of the 12th Army was advancing to Kiev from the west, and the 44th Infantry Division from the east.
On December 10, the 44th Infantry Division of the 12th Army withdrew to the Dnieper River.

On the night of 15 to 16 December, with the assistance of local fisherman PK Alekseenko (Alekseyev), the 44th Infantry Division under command of Ivan Naumovich Dubovoy
forced the Dnieper, which was just starting to freeze.
Early on the morning of December 16, the Reds unexpectedly attacked the White's positions from the rear and occupied the bridges. After a twelve-hour battle, the Whites retreated. On the same day, the 58th Infantry Division under command of Ivan Fedko entered the city.

1919 in Ukraine
Battles of the Russian Civil War
Conflicts in 1919
Battles involving Ukraine
December 1919 events
1910s in Kyiv